Dennis James Allen (born September 22, 1972) is an American football coach who is the head coach for the New Orleans Saints of the National Football League (NFL). He served as head coach of the Oakland Raiders from 2012 to 2014. Allen also previously coached for the Denver Broncos, New Orleans Saints, Atlanta Falcons, University of Tulsa, and his alma mater, Texas A&M University. In 2022, Allen was promoted to head coach of the Saints after spending the previous seven seasons as the team's defensive coordinator.

Early life and playing career
Born in Atlanta, Allen grew up in Hurst, Texas near Fort Worth and graduated from L. D. Bell High School. Allen attended Texas A&M University and played as a safety on R. C. Slocum's "Wrecking Crew" defense. Allen made an interception in the fourth quarter that secured an 18–9 win for Texas A&M over rival Texas. In the 1994 and 1995 seasons, Allen started the final 21 games of his collegiate career and was part of a defensive unit that ranked in the top five in the nation. Allen earned a B.B.A. in management from the Texas A&M’s Mays Business School in 1995. In 1996, Allen signed with the Buffalo Bills as an undrafted free agent but was cut during training camp.

Coaching career

Early coaching career
Allen began his coaching career at his alma mater Texas A&M, as a graduate assistant coach under his former coach R. C. Slocum. Holding that position from 1996 to 1999, Allen worked mostly with the secondary while pursuing a master's degree in kinesiology from the Texas A&M College of Education. He completed his degree in 1998. From 2000 to 2001, Allen coached the secondary at Tulsa.

Atlanta Falcons
With the Atlanta Falcons, Allen was a defensive quality control coach from 2002 to 2003 then defensive assistant from 2004 to 2005.

New Orleans Saints
Allen then moved to the New Orleans Saints, as defensive line coach from 2006 to 2007 before being secondary coach from 2008 to 2010. The Saints won Super Bowl XLIV in 2009, in which the Saints ranked 3rd in interceptions despite giving up 321 yards per game.

Denver Broncos
After his success with the Saints' secondary, he was hired to be the Denver Broncos’ defensive coordinator. The Broncos defense was in the bottom half of yards allowed, ranked 23rd, but were 5th in the league in sacks in 2011.

Oakland Raiders
On January 24, 2012, Oakland Raiders' general manager Reggie McKenzie hired Allen as the team's 18th head coach.  He was the first Raiders defense-oriented head coach since John Madden's retirement after the 1978 season, because the team's longtime former owner Al Davis (until his death during the 2011 season) preferred offensive-minded head coaches.

In his first season as head coach, the Raiders struggled as they finished the 2012 season with a record of 4–12.  That offseason, the Raiders were facing salary cap problems and had traded away most of their draft picks prior to Allen's arrival, which did not allow him to establish his system with the right players. In the middle of the 2013 season, Allen decided to bench quarterback Terrelle Pryor (who was injured) for undrafted rookie Matt McGloin, in hopes of salvaging the  rest of the season.  Later, Pryor continued to be benched although he was healthy enough to return.

On September 29, 2014, following a 38–14 loss to the Miami Dolphins and beginning the 2014 NFL season with 4 straight losses, Allen was fired.

New Orleans Saints (second stint)
The Saints rehired Allen as senior defensive assistant on January 20, 2015. After Rob Ryan was fired later in the season, on November 16, Allen was promoted to defensive coordinator. On November 29,  Allen's first game as defensive coordinator, the Saints were defeated by the Houston Texans 24–6. His defense gave up 362 yards while recording one sack and one interception in the loss.

Allen was promoted to New Orleans Saints head coach on February 8, 2022. On December 10, the NFL fined Allen $100,000 for defensive end Cameron Jordan faking an injury in the Week 13 game against the Tampa Bay Buccaneers.

Personal life
His father Grady Allen was also a standout linebacker for the Aggies and later in the NFL for the Falcons. Dennis and his wife, Alisson, have a son, Garrison, and a daughter, Layla.

Head coaching record

References

External links

New Orleans Saints bio

1972 births
Living people
American football safeties
Atlanta Falcons coaches
Buffalo Bills players
Denver Broncos coaches
New Orleans Saints coaches
New Orleans Saints head coaches
Oakland Raiders head coaches
Texas A&M Aggies football coaches
Texas A&M Aggies football players
Tulsa Golden Hurricane football coaches
People from Hurst, Texas
Players of American football from Texas
Players of American football from Atlanta
National Football League defensive coordinators